Osnaburgh 63B is a First Nations reserve in Kenora District, Ontario. It is one of the reserves of the Mishkeegogamang First Nation, alongside Osnaburgh 63A.

Osnaburgh 63B is made up of five separate areas known as Dog Hole Bay, Sandy Road, Bottle Hill, Trailer Park, Main Reserve..

References

Ojibwe reserves in Ontario
Communities in Kenora District